Reena Ninan (born April 18, 1979) is an American television journalist, most recently working for CBS News, based in New York City.

Career
Ninan anchored CBSN, and was the anchor from 2016-2020, of the Saturday edition of the CBS Weekend News until being replaced by Adriana Diaz. She also reported for CBS This Morning, CBS Evening News and other CBS broadcasts. She started her career as a producer at the Washington Post. From 2004 to 2012 she reported for Fox News Channel, becoming Fox News' Middle East Correspondent in 2007 until she left the network in 2012. She has reported from throughout the world, including Libya, Indonesia, India, Israel, Lebanon, Jordan, Egypt, and Iraq during the Iraq War. In July 2011, she was named one of Glamour magazine's "Women on the Front Lines." Ninan began working at ABC News in 2012 in the Washington bureau, where she covered the White House and the State Department. She later moved to New York, reporting for Good Morning America and continuing to travel abroad as a foreign correspondent.

In April 2015, Ninan was named co-anchor of ABC's early morning shows World News Now and America This Morning, alongside T. J. Holmes. She was hired by CBS in 2016 and worked for them until partially through 2020.

Personal life
Ninan is married to author and former Newsweek reporter Kevin Peraino and has two children.

See also
 New Yorkers in journalism

References

1979 births
American expatriates in Israel
American writers of Indian descent
American television reporters and correspondents
Fox News people
George Washington University School of Media and Public Affairs alumni
Living people
People from Tampa, Florida
American women television journalists
CBS News people